The 1954 Chatham Cup was the 27th annual nationwide knockout football competition in New Zealand.

The competition was run on a regional basis, with regional associations each holding separate qualifying rounds.

Teams taking part in the final rounds are known to have included Onehunga (Auckland), Eastern Union (Gisborne), Moturoa (New Plymouth), Napier Rovers, (Hawkes Bay), Wanganui Settlers (Wanganui), Kiwi United (Manawatu), Stop Out (Lower Hutt/Wellington), Woodbourne (Marlborough), Western (Christchurch), Northern (Dunedin), Brigadiers (Southland), Mangakino (Bay of Plenty), Millerton Thistle (Buller/West Coast).

Controversial refereeing
Referee Morrie Swain was involved in an incident in an early round of the competition held in Wellington between Apollon and Zealandia. His decisions incensed one of the teams so much that he was chased from the field and had to take shelter by locking himself in a dressing room.

Results
Quarterfinals

Semifinals

Final

References

Rec.Sport.Soccer Statistics Foundation New Zealand 1954 page

Chatham Cup
Chatham Cup
Chatham Cup